The 1987–88 Czechoslovak Extraliga season was the 45th season of the Czechoslovak Extraliga, the top level of ice hockey in Czechoslovakia. 12 teams participated in the league, and VSZ Kosice won the championship.

Regular season

Playoffs

Quarterfinal 
Motor České Budějovice – Poldi SONP Kladno 5:6 (0:1,2:2,3:3)
Motor České Budějovice – Poldi SONP Kladno 8:6 (3:1,3:3,2:2)
Poldi SONP Kladno – Motor České Budějovice 2:1 (1:0,1:1,0:0)
Poldi SONP Kladno – Motor České Budějovice 7:2 (4:0,3:1,0:1)
VSŽ Košice – Dukla Trenčín 4:3 PP (1:1,0:1,2:1,1:0)
VSŽ Košice – Dukla Trenčín 5:2 (1:2,3:0,1:0)
Dukla Trenčín – VSŽ Košice 5:2 (1:1,1:0,3:1)
Dukla Trenčín – VSŽ Košice 2:5 (1:0,1:3,0:2)
Sparta Praha – Tesla Pardubice 3:2 SN (1:0,1:2,0:0,0:0,0:0,0:0)
Sparta Praha – Tesla Pardubice 2:5 (1:2,0:1,1:2)
Tesla Pardubice – Sparta Praha 2:4 (1:2,0:1,1:1)
Tesla Pardubice – Sparta Praha 4:5 (1:1,1:2,2:2)
Dukla Jihlava – CHZ Litvínov 4:3 PP (0:0,1:1,2:2,1:0)
Dukla Jihlava – CHZ Litvínov 5:3 (3:0,0:2,2:1)
CHZ Litvínov – Dukla Jihlava 4:6 (2:0,1:2,1:4)

Semifinal 
VSŽ Košice – Poldi SONP Kladno 8:3 (1:1,4:2,3:0)
VSŽ Košice – Poldi SONP Kladno 2:3 (1:0,1:0,0:3)
Poldi SONP Kladno – VSŽ Košice 2:4 (0:0,1:2,1:2)
Poldi SONP Kladno – VSŽ Košice 3:6 (2:1,1:2,0:3)
Sparta Praha – Dukla Jihlava 4:0 (3:0,1:0,0:0)
Sparta Praha – Dukla Jihlava 1:7 (0:1,0:4,1:2)
Dukla Jihlava – Sparta Praha 1:2 PP (0:0,1:1,0:0,0:1)
Dukla Jihlava – Sparta Praha 3:1 (1:0,1:0,1:1)
Sparta Praha – Dukla Jihlava 5:1 (0:1,3:0,2:0)

Final 
VSŽ Košice – Sparta Praha 0:2 (0:0,0:0,0:2)
VSŽ Košice – Sparta Praha 4:0 (0:0,2:0,2:0)
Sparta Praha – VSŽ Košice 3:6 (0:2,2:1,1:3)
Sparta Praha – VSŽ Košice 5:6 PP (2:2,1:2,2:1,0:0,0:1)

Placing round 
Motor České Budějovice – Dukla Trenčín 5:4 (3:1,0:0,2:3)
Motor České Budějovice – Dukla Trenčín 7:2 (2:1,4:0,1:1)
Dukla Trenčín – Motor České Budějovice 1:7 (0:1,1:2,0:4)
CHZ Litvínov – Tesla Pardubice 0:7 (0:3,0:1,0:3)
CHZ Litvínov – Tesla Pardubice 2:8 (0:5,0:2,2:1)
Tesla Pardubice – CHZ Litvínov 9:4 (2:1,4:0,3:3)
 7th place
CHZ Litvínov – Dukla Trenčín 3:6 (0:1,1:3,2:2)
CHZ Litvínov – Dukla Trenčín 5:7 (2:1,2:3,1:3)
Dukla Trenčín – CHZ Litvínov 7:2 (2:0,1:0,4:2)
 5th place
Motor České Budějovice – Tesla Pardubice 9:1 (5:0,2:1,2:0)
Motor České Budějovice – Tesla Pardubice 7:5 (0:3,2:1,5:1)
Tesla Pardubice – Motor České Budějovice 2:6 (1:0,0:3,1:3)
 3rd place
Dukla Jihlava – Poldi SONP Kladno 4:6 (2:4,1:1,1:1)
Dukla Jihlava – Poldi SONP Kladno 7:4 (2:0,3:1,2:3)
Poldi SONP Kladno – Dukla Jihlava 5:7 (1:3,2:3,2:1)
Poldi SONP Kladno – Dukla Jihlava 8:7 (2:2,5:3,1:2)
Dukla Jihlava – Poldi SONP Kladno 13:1 (4:0,2:0,7:1)

Relegation round

1. Liga-Qualification 

 TJ Vítkovice – Plastika Nitra  3:0 (2:1, 4:2, 6:3)

External links
History of Czechoslovak ice hockey

Czechoslovak Extraliga seasons
Czechoslovak
1987–88 in Czechoslovak ice hockey